Princess Iron Fan (鐵扇公主, Tie shan gong zhu) is a 1966 Hong Kong film, the second in a series of four Shaw Brothers productions (1966–1968) based on the 16th-century novel Journey to the West. It was directed by Ho Meng Hua.

The other films of the series are Monkey Goes West (1966), The Cave of the Silken Web (1967) and The Land of Many Perfumes (1968).

Cast
 Pat Ting Hung as Princess Iron Fan
 Ho Fan as Tang Sanzang
 Yueh Hua as Sun Wukong
 Cheng Pei-pei as White Skeleton (Baigujing)
 Lily Ho as Sister White Skeleton
 Ching Miao as The Ox King
 Ho Li Jen as Disenfranchised villager
 Ku Feng as Distraught old man
 Ku Wen Chung as Wu Jing-chi
 Lily Li as Chambermaid
 Pan Yin Tze as Cavern dancer
 Peng Peng as Zhu Bajie
 Shen Yi (actress) as Mistress Fox spirit
 Tien Shun as Sha Wujing
 Wen Hsiu (actress) as Distraught old woman
 Wu Ching-li as Cavern dancer
 Wu Wei as Mother Cicada Fiary

References

External links

Love HK Film Reference
Hong Kong Cinemagic entry

1966 films
Hong Kong fantasy adventure films
Films based on Journey to the West
Films directed by Ho Meng Hua